Presidential elections were held in Ecuador on January 11, 1920. The result was a victory for José Luis Tamayo, who received 99% of the vote.

Results

References

Presidential elections in Ecuador
Ecuador
1920 in Ecuador
January 1920 events